Naseriyeh may refer to:
 Naseriyeh, Arzuiyeh
 Naseriyeh, Rafsanjan
 Naseriyeh, Rigan
 Naseriyeh, Sirjan